The Fusil Modèle 1874 or Gras was the French Army's primary service rifle from 1874 to 1886. Designed by Colonel Basile Gras, the Gras was a metallic cartridge adaptation of the single-shot, breech-loading, black powder Chassepot rifle. It was developed from 1872 to 1874 as a response to the German adoption of the Mauser Model 1871 metallic cartridge rifle.

Modified in 1880 as the M80 with an improved breechblock and in 1914 as the M14  to accommodate the 8×50mmR Lebel smokeless powder cartridge, the Gras was replaced as the standard-issue service rifle by the Lebel in 1886.

Description

Converted from the Chassepot, the Gras was in  caliber and used black powder centerfire metallic cartridges with a  bullet over a  charge. It was a robust and hard-hitting single-shot weapon.  Additionally it had a triangular-shaped Model 1874 "Gras" sword bayonet. The Gras rifle was replaced from 1886 by the Lebel rifle.

Development
The Gras was manufactured in response to the development of the Boxer cartridge in 1866, and the British 1870 Martini–Henry rifle which used it. Those were soon emulated by the Germans with the 1871 Mauser. The French Army set up a study group in September 1872 that chose the metallic over the paper cartridge. A second study group in 1873 looked at various metallic cartridge adaptations. Colonel Gras proposed a modification of the Chassepot to accept metal cartridges and on 7 July 1874, the French Army chose his design over the M1871 Beaumont rifle.

History

The Hellenic Army adopted the Gras in 1877, and it was used in all conflicts until the Second World War. It became the favourite weapon of Greek guerrilla fighters, from the various revolts against the Ottoman Empire to the resistance against the Axis, acquiring legendary status. The name entered the Greek language, and grades (γκράδες) was a term colloquially applied to all rifles during the first half of the 20th century. It was manufactured by Manufacture d'armes de Saint-Étienne, one of several government-owned arms factories in France. However most of the Gras rifles (60,000) used by the Hellenic military were manufactured under licence by Steyr in Austria.

The Gras rifle was partly the inspiration for the development of the Japanese Murata rifle, Japan's first locally-made service rifle.

According to the Vietnamese historian Phạm Văn Sơn, a Vietnamese general in the Cần Vương movement, Cao Văn Thắng, managed to copy the design of "an 1874 type fast-firing rifle of French". However, the Vietnamese version did not have a rifled barrel, and the range was limited.

In 1915, 450,000 Gras rifles were sent to the Russian Empire.

After 1918, Mle 1874 rifles were exported to Yugoslavia, Poland and Greece.

Modifications during World War I

Modified rifle 
In 1914, the French Army modified 146,000 rifles to fire 8 mm Lebel by using the barrel of a Lebel or Berthier rifle. They were used by second-line troops. In 1940, after the French defeat, most of these rifles were destroyed by the German occupiers.

Grenade Launcher
Gras rifles and the 11x59mmR cartridges were also widely used by front line troops as converted grenade launchers, known as Bombardes DR (grenade throwers) these conversions had cut down barrels and butts of varying workmanship and fired blank cartridges to propel the grenade, and were used as a crude form of trench mortar.

Users
 
  : In use by the Quebec Home Guard and Papal Zouaves (Both 11mm and later 8mm Lebel Mle 1914 Gras)
 : 15,000 rifles bought by the Force Publique during World War I, still in service with second line units during World War 2.
  during the War of the Pacific
 
 : Several thousand were bought at the end of the 19th century. They were used during the Thousand Days' War, against the Panamanian rebels and various civil Colombian conflicts from the 1920s to the 1950s.
 : the Gras was used by the Ethiopian Army during both Italian invasions, being popular among irregular soldiers. Most were acquired from French. 
 
 : the Gras was used by the Hellenic Army as late as 1941 in the Battle of Crete
 : Used by Irish Volunteers in 1916

 
 : Bought from Greece at the end of the 19th century
 :1300 were  smuggled in by liberal rebels in 1904
  
 : due to firearm shortages in World War I, the Russian Empire received 450,000 Gras rifles from France in 1915.
 :Some were purchased in the 19th century, during World War I the Siamese expeditionary forces were equipped by the French with  Gras rifles modified to fire the 8mm balle D cartridge.
 
 : Vietnamese insurgents of the Hương Khê uprising managed to create copies of the Fusil Gras mle 1874. However, they did not have rifled barrels.
 : still used in Yemen in 2002

Conflicts
French colonial expeditions
Sino-French War
War of the Pacific
Argentine  Civil Wars
Chilean Civil War of 1891
First Italo-Ethiopian War
Thousand Days' War
Greco-Turkish War (1897)
Macedonian Struggle
1904 Paraguayan Revolution
Balkan Wars
World War I
Irish revolutionary period
Greco-Turkish War (1919–22)
Second Italo-Ethiopian War
Spanish Civil War
World War II

Comparison with contemporary rifles

Gallery

See also
Berthier rifle
Lebel Model 1886 rifle
Table of handgun and rifle cartridges

Notes

External links

 A History of Greek Military Equipment (1821–today): Gras rifle

Early rifles
Bolt-action rifles of France
Single-shot bolt-action rifles
Weapons and ammunition introduced in 1874